Sir Robert Howard (1385—1436), Knight, of Stoke by Nayland, Suffolk, was an English nobleman, the eldest son of John Howard (c. 1366 - 1437), of Wiggenhall and East Winch, Norfolk, by the latter's second wife, Alice Tendring. Alice was also an heiress, although not to the same degree as John Howard's first wife, Lady Plaiz, who had brought him estates worth over £400 per annum. They had two sons; Robert was the elder. His younger brother, Henry Howard (d. 1446) was later murdered by retainers of John, Baron Scrope of Masham, after his parents and brother had died. 

In 1420, Howard married Lady Margaret Mowbray, daughter of Thomas de Mowbray, 1st Duke of Norfolk (d. 1399). She outlived Robert, surviving until 1459. Her sister, Isabel, had married James, later Baron Berkeley, which, it has been said, "forged a link between the Berkeleys and the Howards that continued for two centuries." In the words of Anne Crawford,  however, it was "a clearly unequal marriage." It does appear, however, that they made the decision to marry for themselves as adults, rather than as was customary for the period, by arrangement as children.

There is little comprehensive knowledge available as to Howard's career. Early historians of the family made what have been called "somewhat grand claims" on his behalf: for example, that he commanded a fleet of 3,000 men out of Lowestoft to attack the French coast whilst Henry V was on campaign there. It is considered extremely doubtful that this actually ever occurred since such an undertaking would have certainly left its mark in official local or governmental records. It may well be that grandiose stories have been imagined around a simple truth; viz that Howard did indeed fight in France, but that he did so alongside his brother-in-law and regional magnate, John Mowbray, 2nd Duke of Norfolk, who indeed spent much of his career doing precisely that. 

Although Howard is not mentioned on any of the surviving lists of retainers Mowbray took with him, it is likely that Howard was a member of the duke's household. He had, after all, married Mowbray's sister. Further, in November 1428, as the duke sailed up the River Thames to Westminster, his barge rammed a pier under London Bridge; Mowbray lost several members of his household in this accident. Not only did the duke survive, but Mowbray is recorded as having been with him and surviving also. Howard—and presumably his wife—probably lived with the duke at his caput of Framlingham Castle until Mowbray died in 1432.

Howard's father outlived him, although only by a year; having set out for the Holy Land on crusade, he reached Jerusalem but died there on 17 November 1437. Robert Howard's mother had pre-deceased them both; she left Robert her manor of Stoke by Nayland in her will. Howard and Margaret had had three children, John, Katherine, and Margaret. John was to be a prominent retainer for the third duke of Norfolk, and when civil war broke out less than twenty years later, he was to play a leading role as one of the House of York's firmest supporters. 

In 1483, when Richard III took the throne, he rewarded John Howard with the by now-extinct Mowbray dukedom of Norfolk.

Notes

References

Bibliography
 
 
 
 
 
 
 
 
 

1385 births
1436 deaths
People from Stoke-by-Nayland
English knights
People of the Hundred Years' War